Boca Juniors-Carolina is a soccer team in Carolina, Puerto Rico who plays in the Puerto Rico Soccer League.  They were renamed from Gigantes de Carolina to match their affiliated team Boca Juniors.

History
Boca Juniors-Carolina was renamed from Gigantes de Carolina.

Current squad

References

Association football clubs established in 2008
Football clubs in Puerto Rico
Puerto Rico Soccer League teams
Carolina